Paul Okoye may refer to:

 Paul Okoye (singer) (born 1981), Nigerian singer
 Paul Okoye (promoter) (born 1967), Nigerian event promoter, talent manager, record exec, philanthropist and business man

See also 
 Okoye (disambiguation)